The Comayagua cathedral clock, also known as the Arabic clock or the Comayagua clock, is a gear clock dated from the medieval times located in the city of Comayagua, in the Republic of Honduras. It is considered the oldest clock in the Americas and the oldest gear clock in the world still in operation since it has been working for more than 900 years.

History 

The gears were made and assembled by the spanish moors in Al-Andalus during the Almoravid Empire period around the year 1100 during the reign of Yusuf ibn Tashfin. Before being transferred to the Americas, its was working on the Arab palace of the Alhambra in Granada in Spain. After the end of the Reconquista and the expulsion of the muslisms and Jews from Castille the palace was occupied by the kings of Spain since Charles V. during the XVII century by order of King Felipe III of Spain, it was transferred to Las Hibueras region (present-day Honduras) of New Spain, where it would function as the city clock.

Initially it functioned in the Church of La Merced, which was at that time the cathedral of the city, being installed in 1636. However, by 1711 it was relocated to the recently completed Cathedral of the Immaculate Conception, which at that time was the largest building in the city and one of the largest cathedrals in Central america during the viceroyalty of New Spain, being installed in the bell tower of the temple.

Characteristics 

The mechanism based on gears, ropes, weights and a pendulum, the whole set shows the time on the face located on the facade of the church where the number 4 is written in an old version of Roman numerals, showing as IIII instead of IV as most of us know it.

Studies 
For a time it was believed that the oldest gear clock was the one in Salisbury Cathedral in England, since it was made in 1386. However, when the material with which it was made was studied, it was identified that it was built with iron with a much older technique than the Salisbury one was made with, therefore several different historians and researchers assume that this is the oldest working gear clock in the world.

See also 

 History of Honduras
 History of Spain 
 Spanish Empire

References 

Clocks
Comayagua
Clocks by country
History of Spain
History of Honduras